Daniel Toner (born 1992) is a hurling player who plays as a midfielder for the Down senior team.

Born in the Ards Peninsula, Toner first played competitive hurling at juvenile and underage levels with the Ballygalget club. He subsequently won four county championship medals with the club's senior team.

Toner made his debut on the inter-county scene when he was selected for the Down minor team in 2008. He played for three championship seasons with the minor team, before later joining the Down under-21 team. Toner made his senior debut during the 2011 league, winning a Christy Ring Cup medal in 2013.

Career statistics

Honours

Ballygalget
Down Senior Hurling Championship (1): 2010, 2013, 2016, 2017

Down
Christy Ring Cup (1): 2013

References

1992 births
Living people
Ballygalget hurlers
Down inter-county hurlers
Ulster inter-provincial hurlers